Riesigk is a village and a former municipality in Germany not far from the town of Wittenberg in the district of Wittenberg, Saxony-Anhalt,  on the south side of the Elbe river. Since 1 January 2011, it is part of the town Oranienbaum-Wörlitz. It has a population of about 198 (2014).

History
The village was chartered in 1200 the first time with the name Riswig.
1603 : the area was attached as a part of Anhalt.
1797 - 1800 : the neogothic church was erected.

Places of interest
Church of Riesigk

References

External links
Administration
royaltyguide Riesigk
Church
Woerlitz-Information

Former municipalities in Saxony-Anhalt
Oranienbaum-Wörlitz
Duchy of Anhalt